Spalacotheriidae is a family of extinct mammals belonging to the paraphyletic group 'Symmetrodonta'. They lasted from the Early Cretaceous to the Campanian in North America, Europe, Asia and North Africa.

Spalacotheriids are characterised by having molar teeth with three molar cusps sitting at acute angles to one another. The shape of their teeth as well as their long lower jaw indicate a carnivorous/insectivorous diet.

A sub-group of Spalacotheriidae, the spalacolestines, lack a Meckelian groove in the jaw, indicating that they had a modern ear anatomy.

Genera
 Akidolestes
 Infernolestes
 Spalacotherium
 Symmetrolestes
 Spalacolestinae
 Aliaga
 Heishanlestes
 Lactodens
 Shalbaatar
 Spalacolestes
 Spalacotheridium
 Spalacotheroides
 Symmetrodontoides
 Yaverlestes

References

Symmetrodonta
Prehistoric mammal families
Cretaceous mammals